The Ministry of Finance of the Republic of Serbia is the ministry in the Government of Serbia in charge of finances. The current minister is Siniša Mali, who is in office from 29 May 2018.

Ministry's headquarters are located in the Ministry of Finance of Serbia Building.

History
The new ministry was established on 11 February 1991. The Ministry of Industry which existed from 1991 to 2001, was merged into the Ministry of Finance.

The Ministry of Economy was established on 3 March 2004 after being split from the Ministry of Finance. In 2012, the Ministry of Finance was merged with the Ministry of Economy under Mlađan Dinkić, only to be split once again in 2013.

Subordinate institutions
There are several agencies and institutions that operate within the scope of the ministry:
 Customs Administration
 Tax Administration
 Treasury Directorate
 Tobacco Directorate
 Administration for the prevention of money laundering
 Free Zone Directorate
 Public debt Directorate
 Central Registry of Compulsory Social Security
 Statistical Office of the Republic of Serbia
 Republic Property Directorate of the Republic of Serbia
 State Lottery of Serbia
 National Mortgage Insurance Corporation
 Restitution Agency
 Central register of depots and clearing securities

List of ministers
Political Party:

|-
! colspan=8| Minister of Finance
|-

|-
! colspan=8| Minister of Finance and Economy
|-

|-
! colspan=8| Minister of Finance
|-

See also
 Ministry of Industry (1991–2001)

References

External links
 
 Serbian ministries, etc – Rulers.org

Finance
1991 establishments in Serbia
Ministries established in 1991
Serbia